Mycobacterium duvalii is a species of the phylum Actinomycetota (Gram-positive bacteria with high guanine and cytosine content, one of the dominant phyla of all bacteria), belonging to the genus Mycobacterium.

Description
Gram-positive, nonmotile and pleomorphic acid-fast rods.

Colony characteristics
Bright yellow pigmented, scotochromogenic and rough or smooth colonies on Löwenstein–Jensen medium.

Physiology
Fast growth on Löwenstein–Jensen medium at 25 °C and 37 °C within 7 days. No growth at 45 °C.
Resistant to isoniazid, rifampicin, and sodium aminosalicylate.

Differential characteristics
Characterised by the possession of 6 species-specific antigens demonstrable in immunodiffusion tests.

Pathogenicity.

Pathogenesis
Not pathogenic, but evidence insufficient.  Biosafety level 1.

Type strain
First isolated from cases of human leprosy by C. W. Duval.
Strain ATCC 43910 = CCUG 41352 = CIP 104539 = DSM 44244 = JCM 6396 = NCTC 358.

References

Stanford, J. et al. 1971. A study of some fast-growing scotochromogenic mycobacteria including species descriptions of Mycobacterium gilvum (new species) and Mycobacterium duvalii (new species). British Journal of Experimental Pathology, 52, 627–637.]

External links
Type strain of Mycobacterium duvalii at BacDive -  the Bacterial Diversity Metadatabase

Acid-fast bacilli
duvalii
Bacteria described in 1971